Jin Qiaoqiao (born 21 April 1975) is a Chinese actress, singer and hostess of ethnic Manchu origin.

Jin first rose to prominence in 1998 for playing Princess Kongque in the television series Journey to the West. The series reached number one in the ratings when it aired in China.

Jin has won the Favorite Actress Award at the Huading Awards and received nominations at the China Golden Eagle Awards.

Life

Early life
Jin was born in a family of teachers in Heping District, Shenyang, Liaoning in April 1975, she started to learn artistic gymnastics at the age of 7 and learn ballet at the age of 8. Jin graduated from Beijing Film Academy in 1998, where she majored in acting.

Acting career
In 1995, Jin made her film debut in Crime, playing a minor role of Qin Yanmei.

In 1999, Jin played the role of Xia Lian in Through Taoyuan, for which she received nominations at the 17th China Golden Eagle Awards.

In 2003, Jin founded her company Beijing Qiaoqiao Movie and TV Cultural Communications co., LTD. She produced his television series The Perfect Match.

In 2005, Jin played the character Na Qiya in Secret History of the Great Grand King and received positive reviews.

In 2006, Jin appeared as Zhaoyang, a princess in Goguryeo, in the historical television series Legend of Xue Rengui.

Jin released her first single, Chocolate, in 2008.

In 2009, Jin played Princess Yuzhen in You Xiaogang's The Legend of Yang Guifei, an ancient costume comedy starring Anthony Wong, Wang Luoyong, Yin Tao and Elvis Tsui.

In 2010, Jin starred as Xiaonan in Brother's Happiness, which earned her a Favorite Actress Award at the Huading Awards. At the same year, Jin was cast in the film Legendary Amazons, opposite Richie Jen, Cecilia Cheung, Cheng Pei-pei and Liu Xiaoqing. Her debut album, titled As long as you happy, was released on April 25, 2010.

In 2011, Jin appeared as Concubine Wu in The Story of Xiang Mountain, alongside Fu Yiwei and Siqin Gaowa.

In 2012, Jin starred in a television series called Romance of Tang Kongfu with Chrissie Chau, Alex Fong, and Li Man. She also starred in Legend of Lu Zhen, a romantic historic drama series starring Zanilia Zhao, Chen Xiao, Maggie Cheung Ho-yee and Leanne Liu.

In 2013, Jin had a cameo appearance in Out of Inferno, a disaster film directed by the Pang Brothers.

In 2017, she starred as an Empress Dowager in the romance television series General and I.

Personal life
Jin married businessman Yu Dong in 2011.  Their daughter was born on August 9, 2013.

Works

Film

Television

Albums

Awards

References

External links

1975 births
Actresses from Shenyang
Living people
Actresses from Liaoning
Beijing Film Academy alumni
Musicians from Shenyang
Singers from Liaoning
Chinese television presenters
Chinese film actresses
Chinese television actresses
Manchu actresses
Manchu singers
21st-century Chinese women singers
Chinese women television presenters